Henry Thring, 1st Baron Thring KCB (3 November 1818 – 4 February 1907), was a British lawyer and civil servant.

Early life
Henry was born in Alford, Somerset on 3 November 1818. He was the second son of Sarah (née Jenkyns) Thring (1791–1891) and the Rev. John Gale Dalton Thring (1784–1874), the Rector of Alford and later rural Dean for Cary. Among his siblings were John Charles Thring, Theodore Thring, a Commissioner of Bankruptcy; the schoolmaster Rev. Edward Thring, the hymn-writer Rev. Godfrey Thring and the cricketer and barrister Theodore Thring.

His maternal grandfather was Rev. John Jenkyn of Evercreech, Somerset. His nephew Arthur also served as First Parliamentary Counsel from 1903 to 1917 and was knighted in 1908.

He was educated at Shrewsbury School and Magdalene College, Cambridge.

Career
Thring was appointed First Parliamentary Counsel when that office was established in 1869, a position he held until 1886. He became known for his role as a parliamentary draftsman and as an innovator in the framing of legislation. Thring was appointed a Companion of the Order of the Bath (CB) in 1872, and promoted to Knight Commander (KCB) in 1873.

In 1886, he was raised to the peerage as Baron Thring, of Alderhurst in the County of Surrey. He was a regular contributor in the House of Lords until 1905. Apart from his career in Parliament he also served on the Council of the Royal College of Music.

Personal life
In 1856, he married Elizabeth Cardwell (1822–1897), a daughter of John Cardwell, Esq. Together, they were the parents of one daughter:

 Hon. Katharine Annie Thring (1861–1947) who did not marry.

Lord Thring, who lived at 5 Queen's Gate Gardens, SW, died in February 1907, aged 88. Upon his death, the barony became extinct.

References

External links
 
 
 
 Henry Thring, 1st Baron Thring (1818-1907), Author National Portrait Gallery, London

1818 births
1907 deaths
Barons in the Peerage of the United Kingdom
Members of the Inner Temple
People educated at Shrewsbury School
Knights Commander of the Order of the Bath
Peers of the United Kingdom created by Queen Victoria
Alumni of Magdalene College, Cambridge
First Parliamentary Counsel